Gille Ísa Ua Maílín (died 1184)    was an Irish bishop in the 12th century: he took the oath of fealty to Henry II in 1172 as Bishop of Mayo.

References 

12th-century Roman Catholic bishops in Ireland
Bishops of Mayo
1184 deaths